Zasorino is a rural locality (a village) in Yenangskoye Rural Settlement, Kichmengsko-Gorodetsky District, Vologda Oblast, Russia. The population was 21 as of 2002.

Geography 
Zasorino is located 54 km east of Kichmengsky Gorodok (the district's administrative centre) by road. Aksenovshchina is the nearest rural locality.

References 

Rural localities in Kichmengsko-Gorodetsky District